The Malayan laughingthrush (Trochalopteron peninsulae) is a species of laughingthrush that was for some time included as a subspecies of the Trochalopteron erythrocephalum. This species is found in the extreme south of Thailand and in peninsular Malaysia.

External links
 Photographs

Malayan laughingthrush
Birds of the Malay Peninsula
Malayan laughingthrush